Xyris juncea, the dwarf yellow-eye found in northern and eastern Australia. A widespread plant seen in swampy areas. A tufted herb, growing up to 30 cm high. This is one of the many plants first published by Robert Brown with the type known as "(J.) v.v." Appearing in his Prodromus Florae Novae Hollandiae et Insulae Van Diemen in 1810. The specific epithet juncea is derived from Latin, meaning a resemblance to a sedge.

References

juncea
Flora of New South Wales
Flora of Queensland
Flora of Victoria (Australia)
Flora of the Northern Territory
Plants described in 1810